The Philadelphia Cycling Classic was an elite women's professional one-day road bicycle race held in the United States, between 2013 and 2016. The race was established as a successor to the Liberty Classic, which was last held in 2012.

In 2015, the event became part of the UCI Women's Road World Cup, and was included in the inaugural UCI Women's World Tour the year after, but was discontinued after its fourth running.

Past winners

References

External links 

Cycle races in the United States
Women's road bicycle races
 
Sports competitions in Pennsylvania
Recurring sporting events established in 2013
2013 establishments in Pennsylvania
Recurring sporting events disestablished in 2016
2016 disestablishments in Pennsylvania
Summer events in the United States
UCI Women's World Tour races
Women's sports in Pennsylvania